Heinrich Welsch (born 13 October 1888 in Saarlouis – died 23 November 1976 in Saarbrücken) was a politician but not a member of a political party. He was Minister President of Saarland in 1955 and 1956.

Life and career up to World War II

From 1908 to 1911 he studied law at the Universities of Freiburg, Munich and Bonn. In 1911 he graduated from the 1st state exam and then was a trainee at the local courts and Merzig Saarlouis, the District Court and the Prosecutor's Office and the Saarbrücken Higher Regional Court of Cologne. In 1921 he passed the 2nd state examination and was then until 1934 Attorney in Saarbrücken. Then he was until 1935 the provincial government in Trier Speaker and head of the state police office. From 1935 to 1936 he acted as a representative of Germany at the Supreme Court vote in Saarland, which was to monitor the referendum on the membership of the Saarland. Then he served until 1945 as Chief Prosecutor at the Higher Regional Court in Zweibrücken. During this period he was also 1938-1940 Special Representative with the authority of the Reich Commissioner for the reunion of Austria with the German Reich and from 1940 to 1945 head of the German justice administration in occupied Lorraine.

Even after the war Welsch took numerous functions: From 1948 to 1957 he was president of the National Insurance Office and the country's supply Court of Saarland and 1950 Chairman of the Board of the Railways of the Saarland.

Political offices

From 1951 to 1952 Welsch was the director of the Ministry of Labor and Welfare, and after the resignation of the Saarland Prime Minister Johannes Hoffmann, who thus drew the consequences of the rejection of the favored him Saar Statute, he was, although he belonged to no party, on 29 October 1955 his successor as prime minister and at the same time Minister of Justice and Minister of Labor and Welfare. On 18 December 1955, the parliament of Saarland was newly elected. Welsch ruled with his Cabinet until January 10, 1956. His successor then was Hubert Ney.

Other functions

 1956–1973 president of the National Association Saar of the German Red Cross

Awards

Heinrich Welsch was awarded the Grand Cross of Merit with Star and Sash of Merit of the Federal Republic of Germany. [2]

1888 births
1976 deaths
Grand Crosses with Star and Sash of the Order of Merit of the Federal Republic of Germany
Ministers-President of Saarland